"Synchronicity II" is a song by the Police, and the third single from their album Synchronicity. Written by lead singer and bassist Sting, it was released as a single in the UK and the U.S. by A&M Records, reached No. 17 in the UK Singles Chart and No. 16 on the Billboard Hot 100 in December 1983. It features the non-album track "Once Upon a Daydream" on the b-side. The song was described by People Weekly as "aggressive" and "steely."

Background
The song, which refers to Carl Jung's theory of synchronicity, nominally tells the story of a father whose home, work life, and environment are dispiriting and depressing. Lyrics refer to "Grandmother screaming at the wall", as well as "mother chants her litany of boredom and frustration, but we know all her suicides are fake". Later, we hear about humiliation by his boss ("and every single meeting with his so-called superior/is a humiliating kick in the crotch"), all the while he "knows that something somewhere has to break". Meanwhile, something monstrous is emerging from a "dark Scottish lake/loch", a reference to the Loch Ness Monster—a parallel to the father's own inner anguish.

Interpretations of the lyric vary widely. Writing in Entertainment Weekly about a 1996 Sting tour, Chris Willman said:

Sting explained the theme of the song to Time magazine: 

"Synchronicity II" also may have taken inspiration from the poem "The Second Coming" by William Butler Yeats. The theme of "The Second Coming" is similar to that of "Synchronicity II"—a civilisation beginning to collapse, and the rise of something new, something perhaps savage, to take its place.

In "Synchronicity II" guitarist Andy Summers "forgoes the pretty clean sounds for post-apocalyptic squeals and crashing power chords", writes Matt Blackett in Guitar Player magazine. Summers recalls how the feedback was created: "So I was in the studio with the Strat and two Marshalls full up, waiting for them to run the track. I put the headphones on and started messing around with the feedback, really giving it one... six minutes of screeching with my life passing before me on the guitar!"

According to Summers, there was originally going to be a link between this song and counterpart "Synchronicity I": 

The flip side, "Once Upon A Daydream", was a composition cowritten by Andy Summers and Sting. As Sting remembers, "It's a set of chords Andy came up with and I wrote some lyrics to them by the swimming pool in Monserrat. It's very dark but that was The Ghost in the Machine period. Very intense".

Reception
Cash Box said the song "jumps with a contemporary rock drive" and praised Sting's vocal performance and Summers' and Copeland's "powerful" instrumental performances.

Music video
The music video for "Synchronicity II" was directed by Godley & Creme, filmed at a sound stage on the outskirts of London. In it the band are seen performing on top of giant piles of guitars, drums, junk, car parts, wires, with debris and papers flying about, punctuated by footage of Loch Ness for each chorus. The band members stood apart from each other on separate towers made of scaffolding, wearing dystopian outfits. A misty and stormy appearance was created with air blowers and dry ice. During the filming, Copeland's tower caught fire and the crew started to leave the building. Creme told the director of photography to keep the cameras rolling despite the danger.

Track listing

Charts

Personnel
Sting – bass, vocals
Andy Summers – guitar, keyboards
Stewart Copeland – drums

References

The Police songs
1983 singles
Music videos directed by Godley and Creme
Songs written by Sting (musician)
Song recordings produced by Hugh Padgham
Loch Ness Monster
1983 songs
A&M Records singles